In-Fidelity Recordings is a record label founded in September 2002 by Bruce Milne and Steven Stavrakis.

Bruce Milne established the Au Go Go label and Stavrakis was co-founder of Waterfront Records and Fellaheen. Between them they have worked with such seminal Australian acts as Magic Dirt, Spiderbait, Ratcat, The Meanies, The Hardons, The Scientists, Ben Lee, Snout and Eastern Dark. They have also been involved in introducing international acts such as Sonic Youth, Jon Spencer Blues Explosion, Pavement, Dinosaur Jr, Mudhoney and Butthole Surfers to an Australian audience.

The first release on the label was the debut album from The Datsuns. The band had been feted by major labels around the world, finally signing a one-album deal with V2 Records in all territories outside Australia and New Zealand where they chose to go with In-Fidelity. The Datsuns' debut album was released on 16 October 2002.

Artists 
 Sophie Koh
 The Datsuns
 The Specimens
 The Drones
 Capital City
 The Dirtbombs
 The Cants
 Dan Kelly and the Alpha Males
 The Soundtrack of Our Lives
 The Double Agents
 Witch Hats
 Cheyenne Weeks
 Tobias Cummings

External links
Official Site

Australian independent record labels
Indie rock record labels
Record labels established in 2002
2002 establishments in Australia